Lump is a 2000 greatest hits compilation album by The Presidents of the United States of America.

The album includes three covers: "Video Killed the Radio Star", originally by The Buggles, "Kick Out the Jams", originally by MC5 and "Cleveland Rocks", originally by Ian Hunter.

Unusual for a "Greatest Hits" album, Lump features only ten tracks totalling less than 30 minutes in length.  Also, one of the band's biggest hits that also gave them a Grammy Nomination, "Peaches", is missing completely, along with minor hit "Kitty".

Track listing
All songs by The Presidents of the United States of America unless otherwise noted.
 "Lump" – 2:14
 "Volcano" – 3:00
 "Video Killed the Radio Star" (Geoffrey Downes, Trevor Horn, Bruce Woolley) – 3:24
 "Japan" – 2:33
 "Dune Buggy" – 2:44
 "Kick Out the Jams" (Michael Davis, Robert Derminer, Wayne Kramer, Fred "Sonic" Smith) – 1:25
 "Tiki God" – 2:54
 "Back Porch" – 3:00
 "Mach 5" – 3:17
 "Cleveland Rocks" (Ian Hunter) – 2:33

Personnel
 Chris Ballew – vocals, bass
 Dave Dederer – guitar
 Jason Finn – drums

2000 greatest hits albums
The Presidents of the United States of America (band) albums
Sony Music Special Products compilation albums